Christian Ulrik Gyldenløve (3 February 1611 – 6 October 1640) was a Danish diplomat and military officer. He was one of three acknowledged illegitimate sons of  Christian IV of Denmark— the only one by Kirsten Madsdatter. He died in a fight with troops from the Netherlands at the churchyard of Meinerzhagen and was buried in Wesel.

See also
 Gyldenløve

1611 births
1640 deaths
Danish diplomats
Danish military personnel
Illegitimate children of Christian IV
Sons of kings